Thanh Khê is a Da Nang urban district in Vietnam's South Central Coast area. The district has a total size of 9 km2 and a population of 160,953 people in 2003. The district capital lies at Xuân Hà ward.

There are ten wards (phường) in the district:
An Khê
Chính Gián
Tam Thuận
Tân Chính
Thạc Gián
Hòa Khê
Xuân Hà
Vĩnh Trung
Thanh Khê Đông
Thanh Khê Tây

References

Districts of Da Nang